"Marge in Chains" is the twenty-first and penultimate episode of the fourth season of the American animated television series The Simpsons. It originally aired on the Fox network in the United States on May 6, 1993. In the episode, Marge is arrested for shoplifting after forgetting to pay for an item at the Kwik-E-Mart. The family hires attorney Lionel Hutz to defend her at trial, but she is found guilty and sentenced to 30 days imprisonment. Homer and the rest of the family have trouble coping without Marge. The townspeople start a riot when an annual bake sale missing Marge fails to raise enough money for a statue of Abraham Lincoln and they have to settle for a statue of Jimmy Carter. Mayor Quimby has Marge released from jail in order to save his career and quell the riot.

The episode was written by
Bill Oakley and Josh Weinstein, and directed by
Jim Reardon. After its initial airing on Fox, the episode was later included as part of a 1997 video release titled The Simpsons: Crime and Punishment. It was released again on the 2005 edition of the same set. The episode is included on The Simpsons – The Complete Fourth Season DVD box set released on June 15, 2004.

"Marge in Chains" received a positive reception from television critics.

The authors of I Can't Believe It's a Bigger and Better Updated Unofficial Simpsons Guide commented positively on the episode, as did reviews in The Daily Mirror and The Observer.

Plot
Many of Springfield's residents are persuaded by an advertisement to buy juicers made in Osaka and shipped from there. One of the packers has the flu and every package contains some of his germs. Osaka Flu spreads through Springfield. Every member of the Simpson family is affected, except Marge. Exhausted by caring for them all, she omits paying for Grampa's bottle of bourbon at the Kwik-E-Mart and is soon charged with shoplifting. Mayor Quimby dramatically reveals this to everyone in a public address. Marge's reputation is damaged and the townspeople no longer trust her. The family hires Lionel Hutz to defend her, but she is convicted and sentenced to 30 days' imprisonment.

Marge's absence is felt by the family and the house falls into disarray. The annual bake sale also suffers – without Marge's marshmallow squares, the Springfield Park Commission fails to raise enough money to pay for a statue of Abraham Lincoln; they instead purchase a statue of Jimmy Carter. The townspeople are enraged by this, and riot. When Marge is released early on the orders of Quimby, she is given a hero's welcome. They unveil a statue for her, though it is just the Carter statue with Marge's hair added. The last scene shows Bart and Lisa playing on the statue, which has been converted into a tether ball post.

Production

"Marge in Chains" was written by Bill Oakley and Josh Weinstein and was the first episode that they wrote as staff writers. The script was assigned to them after somebody else had come up with the idea. The first draft of the script was "slightly more realistic" than the final version of the episode because Oakley and Weinstein had done a lot of research about women in prison, much of which was later replaced. For Apu and Sanjay's brief lines of Indian dialogue, the writers called the Embassy of India in Washington to get them to translate. The Embassy was not "interested or happy" but still did it.

In the episode, Jimmy Carter is referred to as "history's greatest monster". In the 2004 Season 4 DVD commentary for this episode, show runners Mike Reiss and Al Jean reveal that they did not like Carter, although they would vote for him ahead of George W. Bush. Kwik-E-Mart operator Apu testifies in a courtroom scene in the episode that he is able to recite 40,000 decimal places of the number pi. He correctly notes that the 40,000th digit is the number one. The episode's writers prepared for this scene by asking David H. Bailey of the National Aeronautics and Space Administration (now at Lawrence Berkeley National Laboratory) for the number of the 40,000th decimal place of pi. Bailey sent them back a printout of the first 40,000 digits. The Troy McClure movie title P is for Psycho is Mike Reiss' favorite joke he ever wrote for The Simpsons.

"Marge in Chains" originally aired on the Fox network in the United States on May 6, 1993. The episode was selected for release in a 1997 video collection of selected episodes titled: The Simpsons: Crime and Punishment. Other episodes included in the set were "Homer the Vigilante", "Bart the Fink", and "You Only Move Twice". It was included again in the 2005 DVD release of the Crime and Punishment set. "Marge in Chains" is also featured on The Simpsons' season 4 DVD set, The Simpsons – The Complete Fourth Season, which was released on June 15, 2004.

Cultural references
David Crosby portrays himself in a cameo appearance in the episode as the 12-step sponsor for Lionel Hutz. The classic Crosby, Stills, and Nash song "Teach Your Children" is referenced when Crosby tells Hutz on the phone, "and know that I love you." During Marge's trial for shoplifting, prosecutors show the Zapruder film and assert that Marge was present on the grassy knoll when President John F. Kennedy was assassinated. The scene where Maude Flanders peers through a hole in a wall at Marge is a reference to the 1960 film Psycho. In Lionel Hutz's dream of what the world would be like without lawyers, the writers had wanted to use the song "I'd Like to Teach the World to Sing", which was used in Coca-Cola advertisements, but they could not get the rights to it. Instead, they used a similar instrumental theme. The episode's title is a reference to the Seattle grunge band Alice in Chains, which at the time of this episode had aired received mainstream success and popularity. Homer also complains in the episode that "[he'll] miss Sheriff Lobo".

COVID-19 "predictions"
During the COVID-19 pandemic, media outlets reported that The Simpsons had "predicted" the outbreak with this episode. Episode writer Bill Oakley alleged that Internet trolls were using the episode for "nefarious purposes", including creating memes replacing "Osaka flu" with "coronavirus." Oakley stated his reference for the "Osaka" plot device was the 1968 flu pandemic, which began in British Hong Kong, stating it was "just supposed to be a quick joke about how the flu got here." When speaking on "predictions" from The Simpsons in general, Oakley continued "It's mainly just coincidence because the episodes are so old that history repeats itself."

Comparisons to the episode experienced a resurgence in May 2020, following advisories by Washington state regarding Asian giant hornets in the region, citing a scene where an angry crowd tips over a truck they believed contained a "placebo" for Osaka flu, and accidentally unleashing a swarm of killer bees from a crate in the process. In real life, killer bees were the subject of much media attention in the United States in the late 1980s and early 1990s.
 
In this episode occurs, Mayor Quimby pretends to be in his office, while actually he is in the Caribbean on vacation. This was likened to many politicians who violated their own "stay-at-home" orders during the pandemic, as well as Ted Cruz allegedly abandoning his constituents during the 2021 Texas power crisis to flee to Cancún. However, even before this incident occurred, Cruz has had a history of openly acknowledging that he is a Simpsons fan. In December 2022, it was reported that U.S. President Joe Biden was visiting the U.S. Virgin Islands during a time when Americans were facing problems at home, such as problems stemming from the impact of a major snow blizzard.

Reception
In its original broadcast, "Marge in Chains" finished 31st in ratings for the week of May 3–9, 1993, with a Nielsen rating of 11.1, equivalent to approximately 10.3 million viewing households. It was the second highest-rated show on the Fox network that week, following Beverly Hills, 90210.

In a review of the episode in The Observer, Caroline Boucher wrote: "My domestic Simpsons correspondent, Simon, reports a particularly fine episode, Marge in Chains to the extent that he watched the tape twice." Karl French of Financial Times characterized the plot of the episode as a "modern version" of It's a Wonderful Life. Dusty Lane of The News Tribune cited a quote from Lionel Hutz in the episode among his list of "Eight Great 'Simpsons' Quotes" – "Well, he's kind of had it in for me since I kinda ran over his dog. Well, replace the word 'kinda' with the word 'repeatedly,' and the word 'dog' with 'son'."

Jessica Mellor of The Daily Mirror highlighted the episode in a review of The Simpsons season four DVD release, along with "Kamp Krusty", "New Kid on the Block", and "I Love Lisa", commenting: "Springfield's finest prove once again why they are the cleverest thing on telly." In a section on the episode in their book I Can't Believe It's a Bigger and Better Updated Unofficial Simpsons Guide, Warren Martyn and Adrian Wood wrote: "We like Bart's plan to rescue Marge from prison by becoming the glamorous Bartina, and Lionel Hutz is supremely inept".

See also

"Orange Is the New Yellow"

References

Further reading

External links

 

 

The Simpsons (season 4) episodes
1993 American television episodes
David Crosby
Cultural depictions of Jimmy Carter
Television episodes about theft
Television episodes set in prisons
Television episodes set in Osaka
Television episodes about influenza outbreaks
Japan in non-Japanese culture